Kulm am Zirbitz is a former municipality in the district of Murau in Styria, Austria. Since the 2015 Styria municipal structural reform, it is part of the municipality Neumarkt in der Steiermark.

References

Cities and towns in Murau District